Ellinor Huusko (born 17 December 1996) is a Swedish professional racing cyclist. She rides for Team Rytger.

See also
 List of 2015 UCI Women's Teams and riders

References

External links

1996 births
Living people
Swedish female cyclists
Place of birth missing (living people)